The Saab 9-7X is a mid-size luxury SUV that was built by General Motors for the American market and sold under the Saab marque. The 9-7X was first revealed at the 2004 New York International Auto Show, and was available starting in the model year of 2005, as a replacement for the Oldsmobile Bravada.

Information and vehicle details 
The Saab 9-7X was introduced in 2004 for the model year of 2005, and was made by General Motors, and the 9-7X was also built on the GMT360 platform, which is the same platform that the Chevrolet TrailBlazer, GMC Envoy, Isuzu Ascender, Oldsmobile Bravada, and Buick Rainier were all built on. The 9-7X was Saab's first ever SUV. 

The Saab 9-7X was originally available in two trim levels for 2005: the Linear and the Arc. The Saab 9-7X was not available with a turbocharged engine, which was quite unusual for a Saab vehicle. All Saab 9-7X vehicles come with all wheel drive (2005 was the first year all wheel drive was offered by Saab), eighteen inch sport wheels, and sport tuned suspension as standard equipment. The 9-7X was built at GM's Moraine, Ohio assembly plant. The Saab 9-7X is classified as a midsize luxury SUV.

When the 2005 Saab 9-7X had been introduced, it had served as the replacement for the Oldsmobile Bravada (which was discontinued as a direct result of the Oldsmobile brand being discontinued in 2004), along with the Buick Rainier. Most of the exterior styling on the Saab 9-7X and on the Buick Rainier was a direct transfer from the discontinued Bravada, except for a front fascia designed to resemble other Saab vehicles.

From 2005 to 2009, the Saab 9-7X was the second most expensive luxury SUV made by General Motors, the most expensive being the Cadillac Escalade. GM had marketed the Saab 9-7X as a direct competitor to more upmarket luxury SUVs, like the Volvo XC90 and the Volkswagen Touareg.

All Saab 9-7X models came standard with side curtain airbags, leather interior, heated front seats, automatic climate control, an AM/FM radio with a CD player and Bose speakers, as well as XM Satellite Radio, and OnStar. HomeLink was standard as well. All Saab 9-7X vehicles came with all-wheel drive as standard equipment. A touchscreen navigation system was available as an optional feature.

For the model year of 2006, the Linear trim level was renamed as the 4.2i, and the Arc trim level was renamed as the 5.3i.

For the model year of 2008, the new Aero trim level was added as a more luxurious version of the Chevrolet Trailblazer SS. Both the Saab 9-7X Aero and the Chevrolet Trailblazer SS came with the 6.0L LS2 V8 engine, which is the same engine that was used in the 2005 to 2007 model of the Chevrolet Corvette. The Saab 9-7X had also came with a 4L60E four speed automatic transmission as standard equipment.

Also for the model year of 2008, the Saab 9-7X with the 5.3L V8 engine was available with Displacement on Demand technology to reduce fuel consumption. Saab had made enhancements to the vehicle's GM made chassis. Saab had also added a lower ride height, firmer springs and shock absorbers, larger brakes with steel front calipers, a strengthened frame, steering revisions and a thicker front stabilizer bar. 

A self leveling rear air suspension was also added. The 9-7X, along with the other GM midsize SUVs built on GM's GMT360 platform were originally scheduled to be redesigned for the model year of 2007, but instead, GM had decided to continue the production the GMT360 SUVs and to only give them minor updates. 

The 9-7X as well as the other GMT360 midsize SUVs made by GM were not scheduled to be redesigned, updated, or to continue production after the 2009 model year, as well a result of GM closing their Moraine, Ohio assembly plant, which was where the GMT360 SUVs were built on December 23, 2008. As a result of this, the Saab 9-7X was discontinued after the 2009 model year.

Yearly production

Markets 
Although the Saab 9-7X was developed for the North American market, the model was also sold in other countries, including Chile, Estonia, Greece, Hungary, Italy, the Netherlands, the Middle East, Sweden and Syria.

Recall
In August 2012, General Motors recalled more than 258,000 SUVs in the United States and Canada to fix short circuits in power window and door lock switches that could cause fires. The recall covered Chevrolet TrailBlazer, GMC Envoy, Buick Rainier, Isuzu Ascender and Saab 9-7X SUVs from the model years of 2006 and 2007. The SUVs were sold or registered in twenty states in the United States, Washington D.C. and in Canada.

Recalls were made due to fire in vehicles. Moisture entered through the door and caused the issue. In 2008, the electrical system in the doors were covered in plastic to protect them.

References 

 
Saab 9-7X will be distributed in Switzerland and Italy via importers, and will be sold through selected Saab dealers, The Auto Channel

GM to close Ohio SUV factory December 23, The Detroit News

External links 

 Saab USA press release
 Saab 9-7X Official Home Page

All-wheel-drive vehicles
Luxury sport utility vehicles
Mid-size sport utility vehicles
9-7X
Cars introduced in 2005
Motor vehicles manufactured in the United States